

Season summary
The 2006–07 Victoria Salmon Kings season is the Salmon Kings' 3rd season in the ECHL.  Before the start of the 2006-07 season, Salmon Kings' Vice President of Hockey Operations and General Manager, Dan Belisle signed an affiliation agreement with the Vancouver Canucks and its AHL affiliate, the Manitoba Moose on July 18, 2006.  Through the affiliation agreement, the Canucks assigned goaltender Julien Ellis; forwards Marc Andre-Bernier, F.P. Guenette and defenseman Patrick Coulombe, while the Moose assigned defensemen Matt Kelly and forward Shaun Heshka. Along with this move, Dan Belisle also signed Wes Goldie, Milan Gajic, Kiel McLeod and Mike Stutzel to ECHL contracts to play for the Salmon Kings.  Through these moves the Salmon Kings hoped to become a powerhouse in its third season.  However, under their new head coach Tony MacAuley, the team struggled through the first half of the season, which caused Belisle to fire MacAuley, after three months behind the bench.  Dan Belisle would then hire assistant coach Mark Morrison to become the fourth head coach in Salmon Kings' history.  Belisle's other mid-season move included a big trade with the Pensacola Ice Pilots, and traded Adam Taylor, and David Wrigley, for Jordan Krestanovich and his brother, Derek Krestanovich.  Through these mid-season moves, the Salmon Kings started to respond going on a late season run and finished their remaining regular season games on a nine-game winning streak.  With the nine-game winning streak, the Salmon Kings completed their season with a 36-32-1-3 record and finished 7th overall in the National Conference to play against the Alaska Aces in their first playoff appearance. The Salmon Kings would eventually win Game 1 by a score of 3-2, but the Aces managed to win their next 4 out of 5 games to win the series 4-2. One of the season highlights for the Salmon Kings, was forward Wes Goldie who led the team and the National Conference with 41 goals.

Standings

Division standings

Conference standings

Schedule and results

Regular season

Playoffs

Player stats

Skaters

Note: GP = Games played; G = Goals; A = Assists; Pts = Points; +/- = Plus/minus; PIM = Penalty minutes

Goaltenders
Note: GP = Games played; Min = Minutes played; W = Wins; L = Losses; OT = Overtime losses; SOL = Shootout losses; GA = Goals against; GAA= Goals against average; Sv% = Save percentage; SO= Shutouts

†Denotes player spent time with another team before joining Victoria. Stats reflect time with the Salmon Kings only. ‡Denotes player no longer with the team. Stats reflect time with Salmon Kings only.

Transactions
TradesFree agents acquired
Free agents lostPlayers Released

 *-Suspended by Team

Professional affiliations

Vancouver Canucks
The Salmon Kings' NHL affiliate based in Vancouver, British Columbia.

Manitoba Moose
The Salmon Kings' AHL affiliate based in Winnipeg, Manitoba.

Victoria Salmon Kings seasons
Victoria
Victoria